La Plume is an unincorporated community in Lackawanna County, Pennsylvania, United States. La Plume has a post office with ZIP code 18440. La Plume is located 11 miles northwest of Scranton, one of Pennsylvania's most populous cities.

References

Unincorporated communities in Lackawanna County, Pennsylvania
Unincorporated communities in Pennsylvania